The Coleman Falls Dam is a hydroelectric generation facility on the James River near the community of Coleman Falls, Virginia. The project includes a gravity dam spanning the left side of river and a power house on the right bank which contain hydroelectric generation equipment.

The dam is located upstream of the smaller Holcomb Rock Dam.

References

Gravity dams
Dams completed in 1851
Hydroelectric power plants in Virginia
1851 establishments in Virginia
Dams on the James River